Two-time defending champion Björn Borg successfully defended his title, defeating Vitas Gerulaitis in the final, 6–4, 6–1, 6–2 to win the men's singles tennis title at the 1980 French Open. It was his fifth French Open title, following wins in 1974, 1975, 1978, and 1979. Borg did not lose a set during the tournament.

Seeds
The seeded players are listed below. Björn Borg is the champion; others show the round in which they were eliminated.

  Björn Borg (champion)
  John McEnroe (third round)
  Jimmy Connors (semifinals)
  Guillermo Vilas (quarterfinals)
  Vitas Gerulaitis (final)
  Harold Solomon (semifinals)
  Eddie Dibbs (third round)
  Víctor Pecci Sr. (second round)
  Ivan Lendl (third round)
  Peter Fleming (second round)
  José Higueras (first round)
  Hans Gildemeister (quarterfinals)
  Wojtek Fibak (quarterfinals)
  Victor Amaya (second round)
  Manuel Orantes (fourth round)
  José Luis Clerc (second round)

Draw

Key
 Q = Qualifier
 WC = Wild card
 LL = Lucky loser
 r = Retired

Final eight

Section 1

Section 2

Section 3

Section 4

Section 5

Section 6

Section 7

Section 8

References

External links
 Association of Tennis Professionals (ATP) – 1980 French Open Men's Singles draw
1980 French Open – Men's draws and results at the International Tennis Federation

Men's Singles
French Open by year – Men's singles
1980 Grand Prix (tennis)